Kevin Mouton was hired as the head basketball coach at Second Baptist School in Houston, Texas in 2011.  He has coached the team to three TAPPS 5A Final Fours, the 2018 state championship, and was named 2017-2018 Texas Association of Basketball Coaches coach of the Year.

He is a former college basketball assistant coach for Rice University in Houston, Texas. Mouton was formerly the interim head coach at Oregon State University.  He became the head coach of the Beavers after the school fired Jay John on January 20, 2008.  He was previously an assistant coach at the school.

Mouton is a graduate of the University of San Francisco.  Prior to going to OSU, he coached at University of Nebraska, St. Mary's College, Eastern Illinois University, University of New Hampshire, Butler University, and Colorado School of Mines.

External links
Oregon State bio
Oregon State coach John fired with winless Pac-10 mark

Living people
American men's basketball coaches
American men's basketball players
Butler Bulldogs men's basketball coaches
New Hampshire Wildcats men's basketball coaches
Oregon State Beavers men's basketball coaches
San Francisco Dons men's basketball players
Eastern Illinois Panthers men's basketball coaches
Rice Owls men's basketball coaches
Year of birth missing (living people)
Saint Mary's Gaels men's basketball coaches